Jesús Rafael Tinoco (born April 30, 1995) is a Venezuelan professional baseball pitcher for the Saitama Seibu Lions of Nippon Professional Baseball (NPB). He previously played in Major League Baseball (MLB) for the Colorado Rockies, Miami Marlins, and Texas Rangers.

Career

Toronto Blue Jays
Tinoco signed with the Toronto Blue Jays as an international free agent in September 2011. He made his professional debut in 2012 with the DSL Blue Jays where he was 0-4 with a 4.14 ERA in 12 games (seven starts). He also played in two games for the GCL Blue Jays at the end of the season. In 2013, he played for the GCL Blue Jays where he compiled a 0-5 record and 5.09 ERA in 12 games (nine starts) and in 2014 he pitched with the Bluefield Blue Jays where he was 1-9 with a 4.95 ERA in 13 games (12 starts). Tinoco began 2015 with the Lansing Lugnuts.

Colorado Rockies
On July 28, 2015, the Blue Jays traded him, along with José Reyes, Miguel Castro and Jeff Hoffman to the Colorado Rockies for Troy Tulowitzki and LaTroy Hawkins. Colorado assigned him to the Asheville Tourists and he finished the season there. In 22 starts between the two teams, he pitched to a 7-6 record and 2.97 ERA. He spent 2016 with Asheville and the Modesto Nuts where he compiled a combined 3-11 record and 6.86 ERA in twenty starts and 2017 with the Lancaster JetHawks where he posted an 11-4 record and 4.67 ERA in 24 starts.

The Rockies added him to their 40-man roster after the 2017 season. He spent 2018 with the Hartford Yard Goats, going 9-12 with a 4.79 ERA in 26 starts. He began 2019 with the Albuquerque Isotopes.

On May 31, 2019, he was called up to the major leagues for the first time. In the game that evening, he made his MLB debut pitching a scoreless ninth inning in a win over the Blue Jays, the team that had traded him.

Miami Marlins
On August 13, 2020, the Rockies traded Tinoco to the Miami Marlins in exchange for Chad Smith. Tinoco was designated for assignment by the Marlins on August 30.

Second stint with Rockies
On September 3, 2020, Tinoco was claimed off waivers by the Rockies. On November 20, 2020, Tinoco was designated for assignment.

On July 28, 2021, Tinoco's contract was selected by the Rockies.

Texas Rangers
On December 3, 2021, Tinoco signed a minor league contract with the Texas Rangers. On June 10, 2022, Texas selected Tinoco's contract as a COVID replacement player. He was returned to the minors on June 20. On October 4, 2022, he gave up a home run to Aaron Judge, his 62nd of the season to break the long-standing AL record previously held by Roger Maris. He elected free agency on November 10, 2022.

Saitama Seibu Lions
On December 16, 2022, Tinoco signed with the Saitama Seibu Lions of Nippon Professional Baseball.

See also
 List of Major League Baseball players from Venezuela

References

External links

Living people
1994 births
People from Maturín
Major League Baseball players from Venezuela
Venezuelan expatriate baseball players in the United States
Major League Baseball pitchers
Colorado Rockies players
Miami Marlins players
Texas Rangers players
Dominican Summer League Blue Jays players
Venezuelan expatriate baseball players in the Dominican Republic
Gulf Coast Blue Jays players
Bluefield Blue Jays players
Lansing Lugnuts players
Asheville Tourists players
Modesto Nuts players
Lancaster JetHawks players
Hartford Yard Goats players
Albuquerque Isotopes players
Round Rock Express players
Salt River Rafters players
Navegantes del Magallanes players